Jim Olmedo Alapag (born December 30, 1977) is a Filipino-American former professional basketball player. He serves as an assistant coach for the Stockton Kings of the NBA G League. He is nicknamed "The Mighty Mouse" and "The Captain".

Early life and amateur career
Alapag is the youngest of six siblings, and his parents are both Filipino immigrants from Leyte. He was born and raised in San Bernardino, California. He said his greatest influence in playing basketball was his father and older brother Crispin. He started playing basketball at the age of 3.

He played collegiate basketball at California State University, San Bernardino, where he established himself as a clutch three-point shooter.  In 2002, he had his first crack of Philippine basketball when he was invited by then-national team coach Jong Uichico to try out for the Philippine National Team bound for 2002 Asian Games in Busan, South Korea.

Professional career

2003: Rookie season
Alapag was selected 10th overall pick in the 2003 PBA draft by the Talk 'N Text Phone Pals and was considered the "steal of the draft". Later on, Alapag and slotman Asi Taulava led the Phone Pals to the All-Filipino Cup Championship by beating the Coca-Cola Tigers in the finals, after overcoming the 0–2 deficit to the Tigers and winning the last four games in the series to capture its first ever title. At the end of the 2003 season, he won the Rookie of the Year award by a huge margin after averaging 14.5 points, 7.02 assists and 6.54 rebounds per outing while shooting 35.4 percent from the three-point region.

2004–05 season
In the 2004–05 PBA season, Alapag won his second mythical first team selection and co-MVP honors with teammate Taulava in the All-Star Game held in Cebu. He also led the Phone Pals to two straight Finals appearance but failed to win another championship against the Barangay Ginebra Kings in the Philippine Cup and against San Miguel Beermen in the Fiesta Conference.

2008–2011 seasons
In the 2008–09 PBA Philippine Cup Finals, Alapag would add another championship ring by helping the Tropang Texters vanquish the Alaska Aces in a seven-game series. He did the same trick in the 2010–11 PBA Philippine Cup Finals against San Miguel after beating the Beermen 4 games to 2 and shared the Finals MVP honors with Jayson Castro. In the 2011 PBA Commissioner's Cup Finals, he once again led the Tropang Texters to their back-to-back championships against Brgy. Ginebra, with him and Jayson Castro again both awarded as co-finals MVP. His team made it again in the 2011 PBA Governors' Cup Finals only to lose to the Petron Blaze Boosters in seven games. At season's end, he was minted as the season's Most Valuable Player, beating the likes of Arwind Santos and Mark Caguioa in the MVP race.

2011–2014 and retirement

In the 2011–12 PBA Philippine Cup, Alapag beat their nemesis, Petron Blaze in seven games after overcoming 1–3 deficit in their best-of-seven semi-final series. In the Finals game, his team successfully defended the Philippine Cup trophy by beating the Gary David-led Powerade Tigers, four games to one. In 2012 PBA Commissioner's Cup, the Tropang Texters again advanced to the Finals against the B-Meg Derby Ace Llamados, only to lose the series in seven games. In the 2012–13 PBA Philippine Cup Finals he led the Texters sweep the Rain or Shine Elasto Painters four games to none and retain the Philippine Cup for the third time (they also took permanent possession of the Jun Bernardino Trophy).

On December 23, 2014, he passed Ronnie Magsanoc to move to No. 2 behind Allan Caidic in the all-time three-point list with 1,172 three point field goals made.

On January 9, 2015, he formally announced his retirement during a press conference at the Smart Araneta Coliseum prior to the second game of the 2014–15 PBA Philippine Cup Finals between the Alaska Aces and the San Miguel Beermen. His #3 jersey was retired by Talk 'N Text on March 8, 2015, during halftime of the 2015 PBA All-Star Game.

He now serves as the Gilas Pilipinas assistant coach and served as the Tropang Texters' team manager.  He was also appointed as a member of the FIBA Players Commission which will serve from 2014 to 2019. For his supposed final PBA game, he played for the South All-Star Team for 2015 PBA All Star. He scored 12 points and dished out 14 assists.

Coming out of retirement and return to basketball

On August 7, 2015, Alapag came out of retirement and was traded by the Talk 'N Text Tropang Texters to the Blackwater Elite in exchange for Larry Rodriguez and then to the Meralco Bolts for Mike Cortez and James Sena. He signed a two-year deal with the Meralco Bolts worth P10.08 million.

Formal retirement in the PBA

On November 3, 2016, Alapag announced in a YouTube video by Alaska Aces player Eric Menk that he will no longer play for the Meralco Bolts in the 2016–17 PBA season hence his formal retirement in the PBA at the age of 39, after playing for 13 years for the Talk N' Text and Meralco teams.

Coaching career

Gilas Pilipinas, Talk 'N Text, Meralco, and San Miguel
After retiring from international basketball, Alapag was quickly tapped by then-Gilas Pilipinas head coach Tab Baldwin as one of the team's assistant coaches. Alapag also served as an assistant coach and team consultant at the Meralco Bolts and Talk 'N Text Tropang Texters. In 2019, he became one of the assistant coaches for the San Miguel Beermen.

Alab Pilipinas
On August 12, 2017, Alapag announced through his Instagram account that he will be the new head coach for Alab Pilipinas of the ASEAN Basketball League. This was Alapag's first major coaching role since his retirement from basketball. He coached his team to the Finals, defeating the Mono Vampire Basketball Club of Thailand in five games, and winning his first ABL championship.

In his second season, they failed to defend their title, falling to the Hong Kong Eastern Long Lions in the playoffs.

In his third season, Alab had a 10–6 record before the ABL season was canceled due to the COVID-19 pandemic. He then left for the US and Alab has yet to announce a new head coach.

Sacramento and Stockton Kings 
In 2019, Alapag reached out to the Sacramento Kings' general manager Vlade Divac for a coaching opportunity. Divac offered him a position to help coach the Summer League squad, which he accepted.

He didn't coach the next season due to the Stockton Kings not fielding a G-League team for that season, but returned the next season to be an assistant coach for the Sacramento Kings Summer League team, where they won the 2021 Summer League championship. He was then named as an assistant coach for the Stockton Kings following their successful Summer League campaign.

National team career
Alapag first saw action for the Philippines national team in the 2007 FIBA Asia Championship in Tokushima, Japan where they finished 9th overall. He returned to action in the FIBA Asia Cup 2011 in Wuhan, China, where this time, he helped guide a young Gilas Pilipinas to the top 4. In 2013, he helped Gilas win a silver medal in the Fiba Asia championship, qualifying them for the 2014 FIBA World Cup, with him hitting a clutch three-pointer in their game against South Korea.

Alapag played his first World Cup stint in Spain. He helped his team to win its first World Cup victory for the first time in 40 years, beating Senegal. Despite his announcement of retiring from the national team after playing in the world cup, he accepted another offer after Jayson Castro was declared unable to play for the Asian Games in Incheon. During the tournament, the national team was expected to win gold because of their performance in the World Cup, but they lost three games in a row against Iran, Qatar, and the host, South Korea, respectively. At the end of the tournament, he retired from international basketball.

PBA career statistics

Season-by-season averages

|-
| align=left | 
| align=left | Talk 'N Text
| 54 || 37.6 || .222 || .354 || .753 || 6.5 || 7.0 || .9 || .0 || 14.5
|-
| align=left | 
| align=left | Talk 'N Text
| 77 || 34.0 || .407 || .360 || .764 || 5.5 || 5.8 || .6 || .0 || 14.3
|-
| align=left | 
| align=left | Talk 'N Text
| 41 || 35.2 || .382 || .335 || .786 || 5.4 || 8.1 || .6 || .0 || 13.1
|-
| align=left | 
| align=left | Talk 'N Text
| 28 || 31.2 || .420 || .347 || .741 || 4.9 || 6.9 || .5 || .0 || 11.5
|-
| align=left | 
| align=left | Talk 'N Text
| 39 || 30.8 || .421 || .361 || .797 || 6.0 || 5.9 || .6 || .0 || 13.5
|-
| align=left | 
| align=left | Talk 'N Text
| 46 || 31.8 || .412 || .406 || .823 || 3.8 || 5.0 || .7 || .0 || 14.9
|-
| align=left | 
| align=left | Talk 'N Text
| 47 || 32.1 || .333 || .360 || .826 || 2.6 || 6.5 || .5 || .0 || 14.0
|-
| align=left | 
| align=left | Talk 'N Text
| 63 || 30.3 || .379 || .349 || .841 || 2.9 || 5.4 || .5 || .0 || 12.4
|-
| align=left | 
| align=left | Talk 'N Text
| 52 || 28.1 || .383 || .348 || .769 || 2.4 || 5.5 || .3 || .0 || 10.7
|-
| align=left | 
| align=left | Talk 'N Text
| 49 || 26.4 || .396 || .370 || .878 || 1.9 || 4.8 || .4 || .0 || 10.2
|-
| align=left | 
| align=left | Talk 'N Text
| 46 || 25.6 || .380 || .324 || .896 || 2.1 || 4.5 || .3 || .0 || 8.3
|-
| align=left | 
| align=left | Talk 'N Text
| 12 || 15.3 || .543 || .485 || .929 || 2.2 || 2.3 || .6 || .0 || 6.6
|-
| align=left | 
| align=left | Meralco
| 47 || 22.5 || .410 || .367 || .833 || 1.6 || 4.0 || .4 || .0 || 7.5
|-class=sortbottom
| align=center colspan=2 | Career
| 601 || 30.3 || .374 || .360 || .803 || 3.8 || 5.7 || .5 || .0 || 12.1

Playing style
Alapag is known for his three-point shooting, play-making, and decision-making during clutch moments. Despite his size, Alapag takes advantage of his speed and agility against defenders.

Personal life

Alapag's parents are Filipino immigrants Crispin and Aurora Alapag. He's the youngest of six siblings.  He considers his father as well as his elder brother Crispin Jr. as his two greatest influences in basketball.

He is currently married to Filipina actress LJ Moreno, with whom he has three children, Ian Maximus, Keona Skye, and Calen Asher.

References

External links
 PBA.ph: Jimmy Alapag Profile

1977 births
Living people
American sportspeople of Filipino descent
ASEAN Basketball League coaches
Basketball players at the 2014 Asian Games
Basketball players from California
Cal State San Bernardino Coyotes men's basketball players
Citizens of the Philippines through descent
Filipino men's basketball coaches
Meralco Bolts players
Philippine Basketball Association All-Stars
San Miguel Beermen coaches
Philippine Basketball Association players with retired numbers
Philippines men's national basketball team players
Filipino men's basketball players
Point guards
Sportspeople from San Bernardino, California
TNT Tropang Giga players
San Miguel Alab Pilipinas
2014 FIBA Basketball World Cup players
American men's basketball players
Asian Games competitors for the Philippines
TNT Tropang Giga draft picks
Stockton Kings coaches